The Tishchenko reaction  is an organic chemical reaction that involves disproportionation of an aldehyde in the presence of an alkoxide. The reaction is named after Russian organic chemist Vyacheslav Tishchenko, who discovered that aluminium alkoxides are effective catalysts for the reaction.

In the related Cannizzaro reaction, the base is sodium hydroxide and then the oxidation product is a carboxylic acid and the reduction product is an alcohol.

History
The reaction involving benzaldehyde was discovered by Claisen using sodium benzylate as base. The reaction produces benzyl benzoate.
  
Enolizable aldehydes are not amenable to Claisen's conditions.  Vyacheslav Tishchenko discovered that aluminium alkoxides allowed the conversion of enolizable aldehydes to esters.

Examples 
 The Tishchenko reaction of acetaldehyde gives the commercially important solvent ethyl acetate.  The reaction is catalyzed by aluminium alkoxides.
 The Tishchenko reaction is used to obtain isobutyl isobutyrate, a specialty solvent.
 Hydroxypivalic acid neopentyl glycol ester is produced by a Tishchenko reaction from hydroxypivaldehyde in the presence of a basic catalyst (e.g., aluminium oxide).
 The Tishchenko reaction of paraformaldehyde in the presence of aluminum methylate or magnesium methylate forms methyl formate.
 Paraformaldehyde reacts with boric acid to form methyl formate. The key step in the reaction mechanism for this reaction is a 1,3-hydride shift in the hemiacetal intermediate formed from two successive nucleophilic addition reactions, the first one from the catalyst. The hydride shift regenerates the alkoxide catalyst.

See also
Aldol–Tishchenko reaction
Baylis–Hillman reaction
Cannizzaro reaction
Meerwein–Ponndorf–Verley reduction
Oppenauer oxidation

References

Further reading 
  V. E. Tishchenko | title= О действии алкоголятов алюминия на альдегиды.  Сложного-эфира конденсации, как новый вид уплотнения альдегида. |trans-title=On the effect of aluminium alkoxides on aldehydes.  Ester condeNsation, as a new kind of aldehyde condensation. | journal=Журнал Русского Физико-Химического Общества (Journal of the Russian Physico-Chemical Society) | volume=38 | year=1906 | pages=355–418 | url= https://books.google.com/books?id=iy9CAQAAMAAJ&pg=PA355#}} ; 482–540. (in Russian)
  В. Е. Тищенко and Г. Н. Григорьева (V. E. Tishchenko and G. N. Grigor'eva) (1906) "О действии амальгамы магния на изомасляного альдегида" (On the effect of magnesium amalgam on isobutyric aldehyde), Журнал Русского Физико-Химического Общества (Journal of the Russian Physico-Chemical Society), 38 : 540–547. (in Russian)
  М. П. Воронҝова and В. Е. Тищенко (M. P. Voronkova and V. E. Tishchenko) (1906) "О действии амальгамы магния на уксусный альдегид" (On the effect of magnesium amalgam on acetic aldehyde), Журнал Русского Физико-Химического Общества (Journal of the Russian Physico-Chemical Society), 38 : 547–550. (in Russian)
 В. Тищенко (V. Tishchenko) (1899) "Действие амальгамированного алюминия на алкоголь.  Алкоголятов алюминия, их свойства и реакции." (Effect of amalgamated aluminium on alcohol.  Aluminium alkoxides, their properties and reactions.), Журнал Русского Физико-Химического Общества (Journal of the Russian Physico-Chemical Society), 31 : 694–770. (in Russian)

Organic reactions
Name reactions